The 2007 Volta a la Comunitat Valenciana was the 65th edition of the Volta a la Comunitat Valenciana road cycling stage race, which was held from 27 February to 3 March 2007. The race started in Alzira and finished in Valencia. The race was won by Alejandro Valverde of the  team.

General classification

References

Volta a la Comunitat Valenciana
2007 in road cycling
2007 in Spanish sport